Mansoor Ali Khan was an Indian politician and is Member of Parliament of India. He was a member of the 13th Lok Sabha representing the Saharanpur constituency of Uttar Pradesh. He comes from an old aristocratic family.

Early life and education
Khan was born in Mussoorie in the (then) state of Uttar Pradesh (Mussoorie is now a part of Uttarakhand). He attended the National Institute of Technology, Srinagar and attained Bachelor of Engineering degree. Khan worked as an Engineer and Agriculturist prior to joining politics.

Political career
Khan has been active in politics since 1980s. However, as Member of Parliament, he has served only one term. Prior to this, he was also a member of the Zila Parishad.

Posts held

See also

13th Lok Sabha
Bahujan Samaj Party
Government of India
Lok Sabha
Parliament of India
Politics of India
Saharanpur (Lok Sabha constituency)
Uttar Pradesh Legislative Assembly

References

India MPs 1999–2004
1941 births
Bahujan Samaj Party politicians from Uttar Pradesh
Living people
Lok Sabha members from Uttar Pradesh
People from Saharanpur district
People from Dehradun district
National Institute of Technology, Srinagar alumni